The following are the association football events of the year 1985 throughout the world.

Events 
February 27 – Leo Beenhakker makes his debut as the manager of Dutch national team with a 7–1 win over Cyprus in Amsterdam, with two goals each from Dick Schoenaker and Wim Kieft.
March 28 – The North American Soccer League announces that it will suspend operations for the 1985 season.
May 11 – Wealdstone F.C. become the first winners of the Non-League Double (Gola League & F.A. Trophy), defeating Boston United 2–1 at Wembley Stadium.
May 11– 56 spectators die in a fire at Valley Parade in a match between Bradford City and Lincoln City.
May 15 – Everton F.C. won their first European Cup Winners' Cup after defeating SK Rapid Wien of Austria 3–1 in the final at the Feijenoord Stadion in Rotterdam after goals from Andy Gray, Trevor Steven and Kevin Sheedy in the 58th, 72nd and 85th minutes respectively. Hans Krankl got the consolation goal for SK Rapid Wien in the 84th minute.
May 29 – 39 spectators die at the Heysel Stadium disaster at the final of the European Cup between Juventus F.C. and Liverpool F.C. The Old Lady became the first club in the history of European football to have won all three major UEFA competitions after defeating the English team.
June 6 – Following the Heysel Stadium disaster FIFA ban English clubs from competing in worldwide competitive matches for five years (ten years for Liverpool, later reduced to six).
Copa Libertadores 1985: Won by Argentinos Juniors after defeating América de Cali 5–4 on a penalty shootout after a final aggregate score of 1-1.
September 10 – Jock Stein, the manager of the Scotland team, dies at the end of the World Cup Qualifier against Wales at Ninian Park in Cardiff.
December 8 – Italy's Juventus F.C. wins the Intercontinental Cup in Tokyo, Japan by defeating Argentina's Argentinos Juniors on penalties (4-2), after the match ended in 2-2. The Torinese side become the first—and remained the only until 2022—team in the world to have won all possible official continental competitions and the world title.

Winners club national championship

Asia
 Qatar – Al-Arabi

Europe
   – R.S.C. Anderlecht
   – Brøndby IF
   – Everton F.C.
   – HJK
   – FC Girondins de Bordeaux
   – Hellas Verona
   – Ajax Amsterdam
   – Rosenborg BK
   – F.C. Porto
   – Aberdeen F.C.
   – Fenerbahçe

North America
 – London Marconi (NSL)
  – Club América

South Florida Sun (USL)
San Jose Earthquakes (WACS)

South America
 Argentina
 Nacional – Argentinos Juniors
 Bolivia – Bolívar
 Brazil – Coritiba
 Colombia – América de Cali
 Paraguay – Olimpia Asunción

International Tournaments

National Teams



Births

January 
 January 4 – Gökhan Gönül, Turkish footballer
 January 5 – Diego Vera, Uruguayan striker
 January 9 – Juanfran, Spanish footballer
 January 21 – 
 Markus Berger, Austrian youth international
 Pitono, Indonesian footballer
 January 22 – Momo Sissoko, Malian footballer

February 
 February 5
 Cristiano Ronaldo, Portuguese footballer
 Igor Shapovalov, Russian former professional football player
 February 13 
Hedwiges Maduro, Dutch footballer
Alexandros Tziolis, Greek footballer
 February 14 – Philippe Senderos, Swiss footballer
 February 16 – Jérôme Bigard, Luxembourger international footballer
 February 17 – Reitumetse Moloisane, Lesotho footballer
 February 28 – Diego, Brazilian footballer

March 
 March 14 – Ian Black, Scottish footballer
 March 15 –
 Curtis Davies, English youth international
 Andrei Pushkarev, former Russian professional footballer
 March 22 – Mayola Biboko, Angolan-born Belgian footballer
 March 25 – Patricio Maldonado, Chilean footballer
 March 31 – Apinan Kaewpila, Thai club footballer (died 2020)

April 
 April 13 – Márcio Tarrafa, Brazilian footballer
 April 18 – Siwakorn Muanseelao, Thai professional footballer

May 
 May 4 – Fernandinho, Brazilian footballer
 May 9 – Rick Kruys, Dutch footballer
 May 16 – Maksim Chernokozov, former Russian professional football player

June 
 June 1 – Mário Hipólito, Angolan goalkeeper
 June 4 – Lukas Podolski, German footballer
 June 6 
 Sota Hirayama, Japanese footballer
 Becky Sauerbrunn, American footballer
 June 9 – Eusebio Henrique de Almeida, East Timorese footballer
 June 22 – Ivan Namaseb, Namibian international footballer
 June 25 
 Scott Brown, Scottish footballer
 Mohd Fitri Omar, Malaysian footballer
 June 28 – Phil Bardsley, English footballer

July 
 July 1 – Ocean Mushure, Zimbabwean footballer
 July 4 – Pei Yuwen, Chinese footballer
 July 5 – Megan Rapinoe, American footballer
 July 9 – Ben Watson, English footballer
 July 10
 Mario Gómez, German footballer
 Tidiane Sane, Senegalese footballer
 Bastian Schulz, German footballer
 Park Chu-young South Korean footballer
 July 12 – David Narváez and Sergio Narváez, Spanish club footballers
 July 13 – Guillermo Ochoa, Mexican footballer
 July 16 – Denis Tahirović, Croatian footballer
 July 18 – José Carlos Júnior, Brazilian footballer
 July 26 – Willis Francis, English footballer

August 
 August 5 – Salomon Kalou, Ivorian footballer

September 
 September 5
Oleksandr Akymenko, Ukrainian striker
Dario Jertec, Croatian midfielder
 September 7 − Rafinha, Brazilian footballer
 September 9 – Scott Carson, English footballer
 September 15 – Denis Calincov, Moldovan footballer
 September 23
Hossein Kaebi, Iranian footballer
Nahomi Kawasumi, Japanese footballer

October 
 October 1 – Tim Deasy, English footballer
 October 17 – Collins John, Dutch footballer
 October 24 – Wayne Rooney, English footballer
 October 25 
 Isah Eliakwu, Nigerian footballer  
 Óscar Granados, Costa Rican footballer
 Michael Liendl, Austrian footballer 
 Juan Manuel Martinez, Argentine footballer 
 Ihor Oshchypko, Ukrainian footballer  
 Daniele Padelli, Italian footballer

November 
 November 4 – Marcell Jansen, German footballer
 November 5
 Alo Dupikov, Estonian international
 Rimo Hunt, Estonian international
 November 15 – Elad Gabai, Israeli footballer
 November 20 – Nurul Maulidi, Indonesian footballer
 November 24 – Milan Kopic, Czech footballer
 November 25 – Fernandinho, Brazilian footballer

December 
 December 10 – Charlie Adam, Scottish footballer

Deaths

January
 January 28 – Alfredo Foni, Italian defender, winner of the 1938 FIFA World Cup. (74)

May
 May 11 – 54 Bradford City A.F.C. fans and 2 Lincoln City F.C. fans die in the Bradford City stadium fire.
 May 15 – Renato Olmi, Italian midfielder, winner of the 1938 FIFA World Cup. (70)
 May 19 – Víctor Rodríguez Andrade, Uruguayan defender, winner of the 1950 FIFA World Cup. (58)
 May 24 – Natalio Perinetti, Argentine midfielder, runner-up of the 1930 FIFA World Cup. (84)
 May 29 – 39 people, mostly Juventus F.C. fans, die in the Heysel Stadium disaster.

September
 September 10 – Jock Stein, Scottish manager (born 1922)

October
 October 9 – Ludo Coeck, Belgian footballer (born 1955)

November
 November 15 – Carlos Spadaro, Argentine striker, runner-up of the 1930 FIFA World Cup. (83)

References

External links
  Rec.Sport.Soccer Statistics Foundation
  VoetbalStats

 
Association football by year